This is a list of the National Register of Historic Places listings in Henderson County, Texas.

This is intended to be a complete list of properties listed on the National Register of Historic Places in Henderson County, Texas. There is one property listed on the National Register in the county, a property that is also a Recorded Texas Historic Landmark.

Current listings

The locations of National Register properties may be seen in a mapping service provided.

|}

See also

National Register of Historic Places listings in Texas
Recorded Texas Historic Landmarks in Henderson County

References

External links

Henderson County, Texas
Henderson County
Buildings and structures in Henderson County, Texas
National Register of Historic Places in Henderson County, Texas